Staton Correctional Facility is an Alabama Department of Corrections state prison for men located in Elmore, Elmore County, Alabama.  The facility opened in June 1978 and was named for Thomas F. Staton, former chairman of the Board of Corrections for the state.  Staton, in a partnership with J. F. Ingram State Technical College, provides technical and vocational training for inmates in a variety of disciplines.

Elmore is the site of three Alabama state prisons:  Staton, Draper Correctional Facility which is immediately adjacent, and the Elmore Correctional Facility about a mile to the east.

References

Prisons in Alabama
Buildings and structures in Elmore County, Alabama
State government buildings in Alabama
1978 establishments in Alabama